The Communauté d'agglomération de l'Artois (Artois Comm.) is a former administrative entity in the Pas-de-Calais département, in northern France. Administrative center: Béthune.

It covered 59 communes, and had a population of approximately 210,000. It was the largest such communauté in Pas-de-Calais (but the most populated was the Communaupole of Lens-Liévin).

It is named after Artois, a former province of France. It was established in January 2002. It merged with the Communauté de communes de Nœux et environs in 2014, and was renamed Communauté d'agglomération de Béthune Bruay Nœux et environs. This was merged into the new Communauté d'agglomération de Béthune-Bruay, Artois-Lys Romane in 2017.

Communes
The 59 communes as of 2013:

Annequin
Annezin
Auchel
Auchy-les-Mines
Bajus
Barlin
Béthune
Beugin
Beuvry
Billy-Berclau
Bruay-la-Buissière
Calonne-Ricouart
Camblain-Châtelain
Cambrin
Cauchy-à-la-Tour
Caucourt
Chocques
La Comté
La Couture
Cuinchy
Diéval
Divion
Douvrin
Essars
Estrée-Cauchy
Festubert
Fresnicourt-le-Dolmen
Gauchin-Légal
Givenchy-lès-la-Bassée
Gosnay
Haillicourt
Haisnes
Hermin
Hersin-Coupigny
Hesdigneul-lès-Béthune
Hinges
Houchin
Houdain
Labeuvrière
Lapugnoy
Locon
Lorgies
Lozinghem
Maisnil-lès-Ruitz
Marles-les-Mines
Neuve-Chapelle
Noyelles-lès-Vermelles
Oblinghem
Ourton
Rebreuve-Ranchicourt
Richebourg
Ruitz
Sailly-Labourse
Vendin-lès-Béthune
Vermelles
Verquigneul
Verquin
Vieille-Chapelle
Violaines

References

External links
 Communauté d'agglomération de l'Artois website (in French)

Geography of the Pas-de-Calais
Artois